The Provincial Junior Hockey League (PJHL) is a Canadian junior ice hockey league spanning parts of Southern Ontario. The PJHL is the third tier of the Ontario Hockey Association and is sanctioned by the Ontario Hockey Federation and Hockey Canada. The league was formed in 2016 with the merging of eight Junior C leagues. PJHL teams compete for the Clarence Schmalz Cup.

History

In the works since 2014, it was announced in the spring of 2016 that the eight Junior C leagues of the Ontario Hockey Association would merge for the 2016-17 season to create the Provincial Junior Hockey League. The union was in an effort to streamline rules across the classification and to promote growth and development.

The leagues that make up the PJHL are the former Central, Empire B, Georgian Mid-Ontario, Great Lakes, Midwestern, Niagara & District, Southern, and Western. leagues that are now the eight divisions split into four conferences.

The first game in PJHL history was played on September 9, 2016 as the Walkerton Hawks hosted the Hanover Barons in Pollock Division action.  Walkerton won the game 6-2.

Teams

Regular Season Champions
Bolded is overall PJHL season champion based on win percentage.

Playoff Division and Conference Champions

Listed are Division playoff champions. Bolded are also Conference playoff champions.

League Championship Series
Bolded is winner of Clarence Schmalz Cup as PJHL and OHA champion.

2022 Schmalz Cup Playoffs

Records
Individual Season
Goals: JD Falconer (Stayner Siskins) - 56 (2017–18)
Assists: Ryan Casselman (Napanee Raiders) - 69 (2017–18)
Points: Ryan Casselman (Napanee Raiders) - 117 (2017–18)
Penalty Minutes: Mitchell Robinson (Schomberg Cougars) - 211 (2017–18)
Wins in Net: Riley Maskell (Grimsby Peach Kings) - 27 (2017–18) & Brett Brochu (Dresden Jr. Kings) - 27 (2018–19)
Minutes in Net: Mathew Boere (North Middlesex Stars) - 2187:56 (2016–17)
Goals Against Average: Romano Liburdi (Lakeshore Canadiens) - 0.93 (2019–20)
Saves: Mathew Boere (North Middlesex Stars) - 1396 (2016–17)
Save Percentage: Brock MacDonald (Lambeth Lancers) - 0.956 (2017–18)
Shutouts: Alex Lepizzera (Clarington Eagles) & Tyler Parr (Mitchell Hawks)(2021–22) , Brock MacDonald (Lambeth Lancers) & Riley Maskell (Grimsby Peach Kings)(2017–18) - 7
Longest Point Streak: William Stadder (Essex 73's) - 31 (September 11, 2018 to January 22,2019)
Single Game
Most Goals in Game: Drake Board (Alliston Hornets) - 8 (November 3, 2017)
Most Assists in Game: Jordan Taylor (Stayner Siskins) - 8 (October 20, 2016)  &  Ryan Young (Alliston Hornets) - 8 (November 3, 2017)
Most Points in Game: Matt Walilko (Midland Flyers) - 10 (January 8, 2017)  &  Drake Board (Alliston Hornets) - 10 (November 3, 2017)
Most PIM in Game: Garret Magalas (Delhi Travellers) - 34 (December 30, 2018)
Most Saves in Game: Brandon Soucy (Campbellford Rebels) - 91 (January 29, 2017)

Team
Best Record: 2016-17 Dorchester Dolphins (39-0-1)
Worst Record: 2019-20 Delhi Travellers (0-40-0)
Highest Goals For: 2016-17 Ayr Centennials & 2017-18 Napanee Raiders (302)
Lowest Goals For: 2019-20 Delhi Travellers (47)
Highest Goals Against: 2019-20 Delhi Travellers (532)
Lowest Goals Against: 2019-20 Lakeshore Canadiens (57)
Longest Game: 115:01 -- Paris Mounties 3 - Wellesley Applejacks 2 3OT (February 25, 2017)
Largest Margin of Victory: Wellesley Applejacks 23 - Delhi Travellers 1 (January 12, 2020)
Highest Scoring Shutout: Ayr Centennials 21 - Delhi Travellers 0 (January 14, 2020)
Most Goals in Game (One Team): Wellesley Applejacks 23 (January 12, 2020)
Longest Win Streak: Dorchester Dolphins 31 (September 17, 2016 to January 6, 2017)

References

External links
PJHL website
OHA website

C
C
Ontario Hockey Association